Meat Grinder is a 2009 Thai splatter film written and directed by Tiwa Moeithaisong, starring  Mai Charoenpura in the lead role. The film revolves around a poverty stricken woman who starts a restaurant where she slaughters people and serves up human flesh, cut from her victims.

The film was released with cuts in Thailand on 19 March 2009, with a duration of 84 minutes. The Thai version by far deviates the most from the uncensored version. This is not only due to the amount of censorship but many scenes were completely re-cut. Added to that are several strange warnings, harmless and irrelevant alternative footage, additional scene in the shorter version, changes in running-speed and even a blur effect due to censorship.

Classified as containing "strong gory violence and horror", an uncut 18 rated version was released in the United Kingdom with a duration of 102 minutes on 23 August 2010, which met with criticism. The film was also banned twice in South Korea for extremely high themes and violence, strong sex, language, horror and imitation risk. The film met with negative responses.

Synopsis
But (Mai Charoenpura) is a disturbed woman who hears voices in her head and is tormented by visions. Having been taught some pretty dubious and unconventional food preparation and cooking skills by her mother, she decides to open up a noodle stall, using the body of a man left over from a riot as the main ingredient. Soon enough, the customers are turning up in droves for her delicious meals, and life is starting to look good after a nice young man takes an interest in her. However, her past comes back to haunt her, and as her mental state breaks down, yet more people end up on the chopping block or hanging up on meat hooks in her basement.

The film also tackles the themes of mental illness and the mistreatment of women, with But's behavior being depicted as being part of an ongoing cycle of violence that she suffered as a child, and which she is now passing on to her own daughter.

Cast
Mai Charoenpura as But		
Anuway Niwartwong	as Prawit	
Wiradit Srimalai as Lek		
Rattanaballang Tohssawat	as At	
Duangta Tungkamanee as But's mother
Pimchanok Luevisadpaibul as Nida 
Jirachaya Jirarachakij as Bua
Somlek Sakdikul as Mogul
Atitaya Shindejanichakul as Oi

Censorship
Meat Grinder was released in March 2009, just a few months before the ratings system came into effect in Thailand. After beef noodle shop owners and vendors protested, the movie was reportedly ordered to cut certain scenes.

The title for the Thai main release was also changed from Kuai-tiao Nuea Khon (ก๋วยเตี๋ยวเนื้อคน; "human-flesh noodles" to Chueat Kon Chim (เชือดก่อนชิม; "slice before tasting"), to remove direct reference to noodles, a staple in Thai food.

Award nominations
In 2010, the film was nominated for three awards at the Thailand National Film Association Awards
"Best Actress" for Mai Charoenpura
"Best Art Direction"
"Best Make-up" for Siwakorn Suklankarn and Nattakarn Uthaiwan

References

2009 films
Thai-language films
Thai horror films
Thai slasher films
Splatter films